Playa Calamocarro is a beach of Ceuta, a Spanish city bordering northern Morocco. 
The beach is about 650 metres in length with an average width of about 15 metres. The area forms part of a protected ZEPA zone.

References

Beaches of Ceuta